Francisco Javier Lloret Martínez, commonly known as Javi Salero (born 27 February 1987), is a Spanish footballer who plays for Atzeneta UE as a winger.

Club career
Born in Altea, Province of Alicante, Salero finished his graduation with Alicante CF, and made his senior debuts with the reserves in the 2007–08 season. On 6 June 2009, he made his professional debut with the Valencian team, starting in a 1–2 home loss against Hércules CF in the Segunda División; already a full first-team member in the 2010–11 campaign he scored four Segunda División B goals in 32 games, but the club suffered its second relegation in just three years.

Salero played in the third level in the following years, representing Ontinyent CF, Huracán Valencia CF, Lucena CF and UB Conquense.

References

External links
 
 
 Futbolme profile  
 

1987 births
Living people
Spanish footballers
Footballers from the Valencian Community
Association football wingers
Segunda División players
Segunda División B players
Tercera División players
Alicante CF footballers
Ontinyent CF players
Huracán Valencia CF players
Lucena CF players
UB Conquense footballers
Novelda CF players